Tombstone, the Town Too Tough to Die is a 1942 American Western film about the Gunfight at the OK Corral. It is directed by William McGann and stars Richard Dix as Wyatt Earp, Kent Taylor as Doc Holliday and Edgar Buchanan as Curly Bill Brocious. The supporting cast features Rex Bell as Virgil Earp and Victor Jory as Ike Clanton.

Plot
Set in the legendary town of Tombstone, Arizona, the plot centers on former gunslinger Wyatt Earp, who helps the sheriff round up criminals. Earp becomes a lawman after he sees an outlaw accidentally kill a child during a showdown. Earp's brothers and Doc Holliday help him take on the outlaw and his gang. More trouble ensues when the sheriff becomes involved with the gang. Earp manages to get them on robbery charges and the situation finally culminates at the infamous O.K. Corral.

Cast
 Richard Dix as Wyatt Earp
 Kent Taylor as Doc Holliday
 Edgar Buchanan as Curly Bill Brocious
 Frances Gifford as Ruth Grant
 Don Castle as Johnny Duane
 Clem Bevans as Tadpole Foster
 Victor Jory as Ike Clanton
 Rex Bell as Virgil Earp
 Harvey Stephens as Morgan Earp 
 Hal Taliaferro as Dick Mason 
 Wallis Clark as Ed Schieffelin
 Donald Curtis as Phineas Clanton 
 Dick Curtis as Frank McLowery 
 Paul Sutton as Tom McLowery
 Charles Middleton as 1st Mayor 
 Charles Stevens as Indian Charley 
 Jack Rockwell as Bob Paul 
 Chris-Pin Martin as Chris 
 James Ferrara as Billy Clanton 
 Charles Halton as Mayor Dan Crane 
 Spencer Charters as Judge Fred Horgan 
 Emmett Vogan as Editor John Clum (uncredited)

External links
 

1942 films
American black-and-white films
Films directed by William C. McGann
Paramount Pictures films
1942 Western (genre) films
American Western (genre) films
Cultural depictions of Wyatt Earp
Cultural depictions of Doc Holliday
Films about brothers
Films set in Tombstone, Arizona
1940s English-language films
1940s American films